William Ronald Reid Jr.  (12 January 1920 – 13 March 1998) (Haida) was a Canadian artist whose works include jewelry, sculpture, screen-printing, and paintings. Producing over one thousand original works during his fifty-year career, Reid is regarded as one of the most significant Northwest Coast artists of the late twentieth century.

He was a matrilineal descendant of K'aadaas Gaa K'iigawaay, who belong to K_ayx_al, the Raven matrilineages of the Haida Nation. This matrilineage traces its origins to T'aanuu Llnagaay. His names are Iihljiwaas (Princely One), Kihlguulins (One Who Speaks Well), and Yaahl SG_waansing (Solitary Raven).

Some of his major works were featured on the Canadian $20 banknote of the Canadian Journey series (2004–2012).

Biography

Early years    
William Ronald Reid Jr., was born in Victoria, British Columbia; his father was American William Ronald Reid Sr., of Scottish-German descent and his mother, Sophie Gladstone Reid, was from the Kaadaas gaah Kiiguwaay, Raven/Wolf Clan of T'anuu, more commonly known as the Haida, one of the First Nations of the Pacific coast. However, Reid was raised without knowledge of his Haida heritage due to the oppressive measures of the Indian Act.

When Reid was in his early twenties, he visited his ancestral home of Skidegate for the first time since he was an infant. In Skidegate Reid spent time with his maternal grandfather, Charles Gladstone, a traditional Haida silversmith. Gladstone first taught Reid about Haida art, and through him, Bill inherited his tools from his great-great-uncle Charles Edenshaw, a renowned artist who died the year Reid was born.

In 1944, Reid married his first wife, Mabel van Boyen. In 1948, the couple moved to Toronto, where Reid further developed his keen interest in Haida art while working as a radio announcer for CBC Radio and studying jewelry making at the Ryerson Institute of Technology. During his spare time, he made regular trips to the Royal Ontario Museum and admired the carved Haida pole installed in the main stairwell, which originated from his grandmother's village of T'aanuu. Upon completing his studies, Reid made his first Haida-inspired piece of jewelry, a bracelet resembling the ones he saw his maternal aunt wear when he was a child.

In 1951, Reid returned to Vancouver, where he eventually established a studio on Granville Island. He became greatly interested in the works of Edenshaw, working to understand the symbolism of his work, much of which had been lost along with many Haida traditions. During this time Reid also worked on salvaging artifacts, including many intricately carved totem poles, which were then moldering in abandoned village sites. He assisted in the partial reconstruction of a Haida village in the University of British Columbia Museum of Anthropology (MOA). In 1986, Reid's work was featured in an exhibit at the MOA, Beyond the Essential Form curated by William McClennan. The exhibit catalog was later published by the University of British Columbia Press as Bill Reid: Beyond the Essential Form by Karen Duffek, Curator: Contemporary Visual Arts & Pacific Northwest.

Working in the traditional forms and modern media (usually gold, silver and argillite), Reid began by making jewellery. He gradually explored larger sculptures in bronze, red cedar and Nootka Cypress (yellow cedar), usually portraying figures, animals, and scenes from Haida mythology. He intended to express his ancestors' visual traditions into a contemporary form.

Major works and awards
Reid's most popular works are three large bronze sculptures. Two depict a canoe filled with human and animal figures: one black, The Spirit of Haida Gwaii, is at the Canadian Embassy, Washington, D.C., in the United States; and one green, The Jade Canoe, is at Vancouver International Airport, in British Columbia. The third sculpture, Chief of the Undersea World, depicts a breaching orca and is installed at the Vancouver Aquarium. Plaster casts of these sculptures are held by the Canadian Museum of History in Gatineau, Canada.

His 1965 painting Smallpox is exhibited at the Canadian Museum of History. Reid's Raven and the First Men carving based on the Haida legend was unveiled at the University of British Columbia Museum of Anthropology (MOA) in April 1986.

In 1975, a dialog between Reid and art historian, Bill Holm in conjunction with a Northwest Coast Indian art exhibition, organized by the Institute for the Arts, Rice University, Houston was published as Form and Freedom: A Dialogue on Northwest Coast Indian Art.

Legacy and honours
Reid received many honours in his life, including honorary degrees from the University of British Columbia, the University of Toronto, the University of Victoria, the University of Western Ontario, York University, and Trent University. He received the National Aboriginal Achievement Award, the Indspire Awards, for Lifetime Achievement in 1994, and was made a member of the Order of British Columbia and an Officer of France's Order of Arts and Letters. He was made a member of the Royal Canadian Academy of Arts.

On 30 April 1996 Canada Post issued 'The Spirit of Haida Gwaii, 1986-1991, Bill Reid' in the Masterpieces of Canadian art series. The stamp was designed by Pierre-Yves Pelletier based on the sculpture The Spirit of Haida Gwaii (1991) by William Ronald Reid in the Canadian Embassy, Washington, United States. The 90¢ stamps are perforated 12.5 x 13  and were printed by Ashton-Potter Limited.

Two of his sculptures, The Raven and the First Men and Spirit of Haida Gwaii, are prominently featured on the $20 note in the Bank of Canada's new Canadian Journey (2004) issue, paired with a quotation from author Gabrielle Roy.

He was the subject of Alanis Obomsawin's 2022 documentary film Bill Reid Remembers.

Later years
Reid participated in the blockades of logging roads which helped save the rain forests of Gwaii Haanas (South Moresby). He stopped work on the sculpture in Washington during this period to protest the destruction of the forests of Haida Gwaii. At the time Bill Reid was alive the archipelago was called the Queen Charlotte Islands. In 1981, he married Martine de Widerspach-Thor (Mormanne), a French anthropologist.

Having dedicated the later part of his life to the creation of new works and these tasks of curation, Reid died on 13 March 1998, of Parkinson's disease, in Vancouver. In July 1998 friends and relatives paddled Lootaas, a large cedar canoe carved by Reid for Expo 86, on a two-day journey along the Pacific coast to bring his ashes to Tanu Island in Haida Gwaii, the site of his mother's village of New Clew.

Gallery

See also
Notable Aboriginal people of Canada
List of indigenous artists of the Americas

References

External links

Iljuwas Bill Reid: Life & Work by Gerald McMaster, published by the Art Canada Institute
Bill Reid Foundation
Article on Bill Reid (2019)
Douglas Reynolds Gallery (Vancouver, British Columbia, Canada)
"Bill Reid", 1979 NFB documentary 
"The Life and Legend of Bill Reid", CBC Digital Archives 
The Raven's Call / L'Appel du Corbeau virtual exhibition from the Virtual Museum of Canada

1920 births
1998 deaths
Canadian people of American descent
Canadian people of Scottish descent
Canadian people of German descent
First Nations jewelers
20th-century First Nations sculptors
Haida woodcarvers
First Nations activists
Members of the Order of British Columbia
Northwest Coast art
Artists from Victoria, British Columbia
Victoria College, British Columbia alumni
Members of the Royal Canadian Academy of Arts
Canadian male sculptors
20th-century Canadian male artists
20th-century First Nations people
Indspire Awards
First Nations stone carvers
Non-Status Indians